Self-propelled may refer to

 Human-powered transport, humans moving themselves (and their cargo) via their own muscle energy
 Machines that power their own movement: 
 Automobile (from auto- + mobile, "self-moving")
 Locomotive (from loco- + motive, "moving from its current place")
 Multiple units, self-propelled train carriages
 Self-propelled artillery
 Self-propelled gun
 Self-propelled anti-aircraft weapon
 Tank destroyer, a self-propelled anti-tank gun
 Mortar carrier, a self-propelled mortar
 Self-propelled modular transporter
 Leonardo's self-propelled cart
 Self-propelled barge T-36
 Self-propelled particles, a model for studying the motion of swarms